Across America on an Emigrant Train is a 1993 children's history book by Jim Murphy. It is based on Robert Louis Stevenson's 1879 journey from New York City to California.

Reception
Booklist, in a review of Across America, wrote "Murphy's style is plain" and concluded "The experience of ordinary people revitalizes the myths of the West." School Library Journal wrote "Murphy has drawn from the writer's (Stevenson) journal to provide a fresh, primary-source account of transcontinental train travel at that time." and "has woven meticulously researched, absorbing accounts of the building of the railroad and its effect on the territory it crossed .. it is a readable and valuable contribution to literature concerning expansion into the American West" Kirkus Reviews called it "A fascinating, imaginatively structured account that brings the experience vividly to life in all its detail: history at its best."  

The Cooperative Children's Book Center found it a "fascinating documentary of westward expansion". and Horn Book Guide  a "vivid account" and an "inviting volume".

Awards and nominations
1994 Jefferson Cup Award - winner
1994 Orbis Pictus Award - winner

References

1993 children's books
American children's books
American history books
Children's history books
American travel books
Children's books about rail transport
Clarion Books books